I Didn't Do It is an American comedy television series that originally aired on Disney Channel from January 17, 2014, to October 16, 2015. The series was created by Tod Himmel and Josh Silverstein and stars Olivia Holt, Austin North, Piper Curda, Peyton Clark, and Sarah Gilman.

Series overview

Episodes

Season 1 (2014)

Season 2 (2015)

References 

Lists of American children's television series episodes
Lists of American comedy television series episodes
Lists of Disney Channel television series episodes